A list of films produced in Italy in 1932 (see 1932 in film):

See also
List of Italian films of 1931
List of Italian films of 1933

External links
Italian films of 1932 at the Internet Movie Database

Italian
1932
Films